The Helicocephalidaceae are a family of fungi in the Zoopagales order. The family contain contains 4 genera and 13 species.

References

External links

Zygomycota